Copperhead may refer to:

Snakes

 Agkistrodon contortrix, or copperhead, a venomous pit viper species found in parts of North America
 Austrelaps, or Australian copperhead, a genus of venomous elapids found in southern Australia and Tasmania
 Coelognathus radiata, or the copperhead rat snake, a non-venomous species found in southern Asia
 Deinagkistrodon acutus, or the Chinese copperhead, a venomous pit viper species found in Southeast Asia

Politics
 Copperhead (politics), Northern Peace Democrats who opposed the American Civil War

Art, entertainment, and media

Comics
 Copperhead (Image Comics) an ongoing space western from Image Comics

Fictional entities
 Copperhead (DC Comics), DC Comics supervillain and member of the Secret Society of Super-Villains
 Copperhead (G.I. Joe), villain in the G.I. Joe universe, member of Cobra
 Copperhead (Marvel Comics), several characters
 "Copperhead", codename of Vernita Green in the movie Kill Bill
 The Copperhead, the masked hero of the 1940 Republic serial Mysterious Doctor Satan, played by Robert Wilcox

Films
 Copperhead (2008 film), a 2008 horror film
 Copperhead (2013 film), a 2013 American Civil War film
 The Copperhead, a 1920 silent film historical drama

Literature
 Copperhead, the second volume in the U.S. Civil War series The Starbuck Chronicles by Bernard Cornwell

Music
 Copperhead (band), a San Francisco area band of the early 1970s featuring John Cipollina

Software
 CopperheadOS, a security-focused mobile operating system based on the Android mobile platform

Other uses
 Copperhead (climbing), a small metal nut used in rock climbing
 Dodge Copperhead, a more affordable, less-powerful model of the Dodge Viper, not produced
 M712 Copperhead, a U.S. guided artillery shell
 Copperhead, a gaming mouse by Razer USA
 Operation Copperhead, WWII deception operation
 Southwest Florida Copperheads, a rugby league team in the United States

See also
 Agkistrodon piscivorus, or the cottonmouth

Animal common name disambiguation pages